

Council Members 

The Supreme Economic Council was chaired by the Custodian of the Two Holy Mosques, King Abdullah bin Abdulazziz Al-Saud, and the Crown Prince Deputy Prime Minister served as deputy chair.
The Council had the following members: the Chairman of the General Committee of the Council of Minister, two Ministers of State who are also members of the Council of Ministers, the Minister of Water and Electricity, the Minister of Trade and Industry, the Minister of Petroleum and Mineral Resources, the Minister of Finance, the Minister of Economy and Planning, the Minister of Labor and Social Affairs and the Governor of the Saudi Arabian Monetary Agency.

External links
Supreme Economic Council

Government of Saudi Arabia